The Chilecomadiinae are a subfamily of the family Cossidae (carpenter or goat moths).

Genera
 Chilecomadia Dyar, 1940
 Miacorella Penco, Yakovlev & Naydenov, 2020
 Rhizocossus H. K. Clench, 1957

References

Natural History Museum Lepidoptera generic names catalog

 
Cossidae
Moth subfamilies